Mayfair is an organized hamlet in the Canadian province of Saskatchewan.

Demographics 

References

Designated places in Saskatchewan
Meeting Lake No. 466, Saskatchewan
Organized hamlets in Saskatchewan
Division No. 16, Saskatchewan